Greene County Courthouse, also known as Historic Greene County Courthouse, is a historic courthouse located at Springfield, Greene County, Missouri. It was built between 1910 and 1912, and is a four-story, Classical Revival style rusticated stone building.  It has a flat roof and low dome over a rotunda. The front facade features a free colonnade of four Ionic order columns that extend the height of the upper two floors. Also on the property are the contributing bronze replica of the Statue of Liberty, the stone bases of two columns from the former courthouse, and a World War I cannon.  It was the seat of Greene County government until a new Judicial Courts Building and Justice Center were built in the 1990s.

It was listed on the National Register of Historic Places in 2007.

References

County courthouses in Missouri
Courthouses on the National Register of Historic Places in Missouri
Neoclassical architecture in Missouri
Government buildings completed in 1912
Buildings and structures in Springfield, Missouri
National Register of Historic Places in Greene County, Missouri